In combinatorial mathematics, the hockey-stick identity, Christmas stocking identity, boomerang identity, Fermat's identity or Chu's Theorem, states that if  are integers, then

 

The name stems from the graphical representation of the identity on Pascal's triangle: when the addends represented in the summation and the sum itself are highlighted, the shape revealed is vaguely reminiscent of those objects (see hockey stick, Christmas stocking).

Formulations

Using sigma notation, the identity states

 

or equivalently, the mirror-image by the substitution :

Proofs

Generating function proof

We have

Inductive and algebraic proofs

The inductive and algebraic proofs both make use of Pascal's identity:

Inductive proof

Base case
Let ;

Inductive step

Then

Algebraic proof

We use a telescoping argument to simplify the computation of the sum:

Combinatorial proofs

Proof 1

Imagine that we are distributing  indistinguishable candies to  distinguishable children. By a direct application of the stars and bars method, there are

ways to do this. Alternatively, we can first give  candies to the oldest child so that we are essentially giving  candies to  kids and again, with stars and bars and double counting, we have

Proof 2

We can form a committee of size  from a group of  people in

ways. We can divide this into  disjoint cases. This can be done in

ways.  Now we can sum the values of these  disjoint cases, getting

See also
 Pascal's identity 
 Pascal's triangle
 Leibniz triangle
 Vandermonde's identity

References

External links
 On AOPS
 On StackExchange, Mathematics
 Pascal's Ladder on the Dyalog Chat Forum

Theorems in combinatorics
Mathematical identities
Articles containing proofs
Factorial and binomial topics